The Integrated Truss Structure (ITS) of the International Space Station (ISS) consists of a linear arranged sequence of connected trusses on which various unpressurized components are mounted such as logistics carriers, radiators, solar arrays, and other equipment. It supplies the ISS with a bus architecture. It is approximately 110 meters long and is made from aluminum and stainless steel.

Truss components 

All truss components were named after their planned end-positions: Z for zenith, S for starboard and P for port, with the number indicating the sequential position. The S0 truss might be considered a misnomer, as it is mounted centrally on the zenith position of Destiny and is neither starboard nor port side.

Manufacturing

ISS truss segments were fabricated by Boeing in its facilities at Huntington Beach, California (formerly McDonnell Douglas), Michoud Assembly Facility in New Orleans, Louisiana, Marshall Space Flight Center in Huntsville, Alabama, and in Tulsa, Oklahoma. The trusses were then transported or shipped to Kennedy Space Center's Space Station Processing Facility for final assembly and checkout.

The structural framework was made using several manufacturing processes, including the investment casting, steel hot rolling, friction-stir, and TIG welding processes.

Z1 truss 

The first truss piece, the Z1 truss, launched aboard STS-92 in October 2000. It contains the control moment gyroscope (CMG) assemblies, electrical wiring, communications equipment, and two plasma contactors designed to neutralize the static electrical charge of the space station.

Another objective of the Z1 truss was to serve as a temporary mounting position for the "P6 truss and solar array" until its relocation to the end of the P5 truss during STS-120. Though not a part of the main truss, the Z1 truss was the first permanent lattice-work structure for the ISS, very much like a girder, setting the stage for the future addition of the station's major trusses or backbones. It is made from stainless steel, titanium, and aluminum alloys.

While the bulk of the Z1 truss is unpressurized, it features a Common Berthing Mechanism (CBM) port that connects its nadir to the zenith port of Unity and contains a small pressurized dome that allowed astronauts to connect electrical ground straps between Unity and the truss without an EVA. In addition, the dome inside the CBM of Z1 can be used as storage space.

The Z1 truss also features a forward-facing Manual Berthing Mechanism (MBM) ring. This MBM is not a port and is not pressurized or electrically powered, but it can be operated with a handheld tool to berth any passive CBM to it. The Z1 truss's MBM was used only once, to temporarily hold PMA-2, while the Destiny lab was being berthed onto the Unity node during STS-98. Since the installation of the nearby S0 truss in April 2002, access to the MBM has been blocked.

In October 2007, the P6 truss element was disconnected from Z1 and moved to P5; P6 will now be permanently connected with P5. The Z1 truss is now solely used to house the CMGs, communications equipment, and the plasma contactors; furthermore, Z1 connects now solely to Unity (Node 1) and no longer houses other space station elements.

In December 2008, the Ad Astra Rocket Company announced an agreement with NASA to place a flight test version of its VASIMR ion thruster on the station to take over reboost duties. In 2013, the thruster module was intended to be placed on top of the Z1 truss in 2015. NASA and Ad Astra signed a contract for development of the VASIMR engine for up to three years in 2015. However, in 2015 NASA ended plans for flying the VF-200 to the ISS. A NASA spokesperson stated that the ISS "was not an ideal demonstration platform for the desired performance level of the engines". (An example of a spacecraft that used an ion thruster to maintain its orbit was the Gravity Field and Steady-State Ocean Circulation Explorer, whose engine allowed it to maintain a very low orbit.)

S0 truss 

The S0 truss, (also called the Center Integrated Truss Assembly Starboard 0 Truss) forms the central backbone of the Space Station. It was attached on the top of the Destiny Laboratory Module during STS-110 in April 2002. S0 is used to route power to the pressurized station modules and conduct heat away from the modules to the S1 and P1 Trusses. The S0 truss is not docked to the ISS but is connected with four Module to Truss Structure (MTS) stainless steel struts.

P1, S1 trusses

The P1 and S1 trusses (also called the Port and Starboard Side Thermal Radiator Trusses) are attached to the S0 truss and contain carts to transport the Canadarm2 and astronauts to worksites along with the space station. They each flow 290 kg (637 lb) of anhydrous ammonia through three heat rejection radiators. The S1 truss was launched on STS-112 in October 2002 and the P1 truss was launched on STS-113 in November 2002.  Detailed design, test, and construction of the S1 and P1 structures were conducted by McDonnell Douglas (now Boeing) in Huntington Beach, CA. First parts were cut for the structure in 1996, and delivery of the first truss occurred in 1999.

P2, S2 trusses 
The P2 and S2 trusses were planned as locations for rocket thrusters in the original design for Space Station Freedom. Since the Russian parts of the ISS also provided that capability, the reboost capability of the Space Station Freedom design was no longer needed at that location. So P2 and S2 were canceled.

P3/P4, S3/S4 truss assemblies 

The P3/P4 truss assembly was installed by the Space Shuttle  Atlantis STS-115 mission, launched September 9, 2006, and attached to the P1 segment. The P3 and P4 segments together contain a pair of solar arrays, a radiator, and a rotary joint that will aim the solar arrays, and connects P3 to P4. Upon its installation, no power was flowing across the rotary joint, so the electricity generated by the P4 solar array wings was only being used on the P4 segment and not the rest of the station. Then in December 2006, a major electrical rewiring of the station by STS-116 routed this power to the entire grid. The S3/S4 truss assembly—a mirror-image of P3/P4—was installed on June 11, 2007 also by Space Shuttle Atlantis during flight STS-117, mission 13A and mounted to the S1 truss segment.

Major P3 and S3 subsystems include the Segment-to-Segment Attach System (SSAS), Solar Alpha Rotary Joint (SARJ), and Unpressurized Cargo Carrier Attach System (UCCAS). The primary functions of the P3 truss segment are to provide mechanical, power and data interfaces to payloads attached to the two UCCAS platforms; axial indexing for solar tracking, or rotating of the arrays to follow the sun, via the SARJ; movement and worksite accommodations for the Mobile Transporter. The P3/S3 primary structure is made of a hexagonal-shaped aluminum structure and includes four bulkheads and six longerons.  The S3 truss also supports EXPRESS Logistics Carrier locations, first to be launched and installed in the 2009 time frame.

Major subsystems of the P4 and S4 Photovoltaic Modules (PVM) include the two Solar Array Wings (SAW), the Photovoltaic Radiator (PVR), the Alpha Joint Interface Structure (AJIS), and Modified Rocketdyne Truss Attachment System (MRTAS), and Beta Gimbal Assembly (BGA).

P5, S5 trusses

The P5 and S5 trusses are connectors that support the P6 and S6 trusses, respectively. The P3/P4 and S3/S4 truss assemblies' length was limited by the cargo bay capacity of the Space Shuttle, so these small (3.37 m long) connectors are needed to extend the truss. The P5 truss was installed on December 12, 2006, during the first EVA of mission STS-116. The S5 truss was brought into orbit by mission STS-118 and installed on August 11, 2007.

P6, S6 trusses

The P6 truss was the second truss segment to be added because it contains a large Solar Array Wing (SAW) that generated essential electricity for the station, prior to activation of the SAW on the P4 truss. It was originally mounted to the Z1 truss and had its SAW extended during STS-97, but the SAW was folded, one half at a time, to make room for the SAWs on the P4 and S4 trusses, during STS-116 and STS-117 respectively.  Shuttle mission STS-120 (assembly mission 10A) detached the P6 truss from Z1, remounted it on the P5 truss, redeployed its radiator panels, and attempted to redeploy its SAWs. One SAW (2B) was deployed successfully but the second SAW (4B) developed a significant tear that temporarily stopped deployment at around 80%. This was subsequently fixed and the array is now fully deployed. A later assembly mission (the out of sequence STS-119) mounted the S6 truss on the S5 truss, which provided a fourth and final set of solar arrays and radiators.

Gallery of Trusses

Truss subsystems

Solar arrays 

The International Space Station's main source of energy is from the four large U.S.-made photovoltaic arrays currently on the station, sometimes referred to as the Solar Array Wings (SAW). The first pair of arrays are attached to the P6 truss segment, which was launched and installed on top of Z1 in late 2000 during STS-97. The P6 segment was relocated to its final position, bolted to the P5 truss segment, in November 2007 during STS-120. The second pair of arrays was launched and installed in September 2006 during STS-115, but they didn't provide electricity until STS-116 in December 2006 when the station got an electrical rewiring. The third pair of arrays was installed during STS-117 in June 2007. A final pair arrived in March 2009 on STS-119. More solar power was to have been available via the Russian-built Science Power Platform, but it was canceled.

They are split into two photovoltaic blankets, with the deployment mast in between. Each blanket has 16,400 silicon photovoltaic cells, each cell measuring 8 cm x 8 cm, grouped into 82 active panels, each consisting of 200 cells, with 4,100 diodes.

Each pair of blankets was folded like an accordion for compact delivery to space. Once in orbit, the deployment mast between each pair of blankets unfolds the array to its full length. Gimbals, known as the Beta Gimbal Assembly (BGA) are used to rotate the arrays so that they face the Sun to provide maximum power to the International Space Station.

Over time, the photovoltaic cells on the wings have degraded gradually, having been designed for a 15-year service life. This is especially noticeable with the first arrays to launch, with the P6 and P4 Trusses in 2000 and 2006. To augment the P6 truss' wings, in June 2021, NASA launched two scaled-up versions of the Roll Out Solar Array aboard the SpaceX Dragon 2 mission SpaceX CRS-22, and is set to launch four more on SpaceX CRS-25, and SpaceX CRS-26. These arrays are more lightweight and generate more energy than the existing arrays. They are intended to be deployed along the central part of the wings up to two thirds of their length. Work to install support brackets for the new arrays on the P6 truss mast cans was initiated by the members of Expedition 64. Work to install and deploy the first two arrays themselves on the P6 brackets was successfully conducted over three spacewalks by Shane Kimbrough and Thomas Pesquet of Expedition 65.

Solar alpha rotary joint 
The Alpha joint is the main rotary joint allowing the solar arrays to track the sun; in nominal operation the alpha joint rotates by 360° each orbit (however, see also Night Glider mode).  One Solar Alpha Rotary Joint (SARJ) is located between the P3 and P4 truss segments and the other is located between the S3 and S4 truss segments.  When in operation, these joints continuously rotate to keep the solar array wings on the outboard truss segments oriented towards the Sun. Each SARJ is 10 feet in diameter, weighs approximately 2,500 pounds and can be rotated continuously using bearing assemblies and a servo control system. On both the port and starboard sides, all of the power flows through the Utility Transfer Assembly (UTA) in the SARJ. Roll ring assemblies allow transmission of data and power across the rotating interface so it never has to unwind. The SARJ was designed, built, and tested by Lockheed Martin and its subcontractors.

The Solar Alpha Rotary Joints contain Drive Lock Assemblies which allow the outer segments of the ITS to rotate and track the Sun. A component of the DLA is a pinion which engages with the race ring that serves as a bull gear. There are two race rings and two DLAs in each SARJ providing on-orbit redundancy, however a series of space walks would be required to reposition the DLAs and the Trundle Bearing Assemblies (TBAs) to utilize the alternate race ring. A spare DLA was brought to the ISS on STS-122.

In 2007, a problem was detected in the starboard SARJ and in one of the two beta gimbal assemblies (BGA).  Damage had occurred due to excessive and premature wear of a track in the joint mechanism. The SARJ was frozen during problem diagnosis, and in 2008 lubrication was applied to the track to address the issue.

Power conditioning and storage 

The sequential shunt unit (SSU) is designed to coarsely regulate the solar power collected during periods of insolation—when the arrays collect power during sun-pointing periods. A sequence of 82 separate strings, or power lines, leads from the solar array to the SSU. Shunting, or controlling, the output of each string regulates the amount of power transferred. The regulated voltage setpoint is controlled by a computer located on the IEA and is normally set to around 140  volts. The SSU has an overvoltage protection feature to maintain the output voltage below 200 V DC maximum for all operating conditions. This power is then passed through the BMRRM to the DCSU located in the IEA. The SSU measures  and weighs .

Each battery assembly, situated on the S4, P4, S6, and P6 Trusses, consists of 24  lightweight lithium-ion battery cells and associated electrical and mechanical equipment. This power is fed to the ISS via the BCDU and DCSU respectively. 

The batteries ensure that the station is never without power to sustain life-support systems and experiments. During the sunlight part of the orbit, the batteries are recharged. The nickel-hydrogen batteries had a design life of 6.5 years which means that they were replaced multiple times during the expected 30-year life of the station. The batteries and the battery charge/discharge units are manufactured by Space Systems/Loral (SS/L), under contract to Boeing. Ni-H2 batteries on the P6 truss were replaced in 2009 and 2010 with more Ni-H2 batteries brought by Space Shuttle missions. The nickel-hydrogen batteries had a design life of 6.5 years and could exceed 38,000 charge/discharge cycles at 35% depth of discharge.

From 2017 to 2021, the nickel-hydrogen batteries were replaced by lithium-ion batteries. On January 6, 2017, Expedition 50 members Shane Kimbrough and Peggy Whitson began the process of converting some of the oldest batteries on the ISS to the new lithium-ion batteries. Expedition 64 members Victor J. Glover and Michael S. Hopkins concluded the campaign on February 1, 2021. There is a number of differences between the two battery technologies. One difference is that the lithium-ion batteries can handle twice the charge, so only half as many lithium-ion batteries were needed during replacement. Also, the lithium-ion batteries are smaller than the older nickel-hydrogen batteries. Although Li-Ion batteries typically have shorter lifetimes than Ni-H2 batteries as they cannot sustain as many charge/discharge cycles before suffering notable degradation, the ISS Li-Ion batteries have been designed for 60,000 cycles and ten years of lifetime, much longer than the original Ni-H2 batteries' design life span of 6.5 years.

Mobile Base System 

The Mobile Base System (MBS) is a platform (mounted on the Mobile Transporter) for the robotic arms Canadarm2 and Dextre carrying them 108 metres down rails between the S3 and P3 truss. Beyond the rails Canadarm2 can step over the alpha rotary joint and relocate to grapple fixtures on the S6 and P6 truss. During STS-120 Astronaut Scott Parazynski rode the Orbiter Boom Sensor to repair a tear in the 4B solar array.

Truss and solar array assembly sequence

Technical blueprints

See also

References

Components of the International Space Station
Spacecraft components
Articles containing video clips